Vilem Sokol (May 22, 1915August 19, 2011) was a Czech-American conductor and professor of music at the University of Washington from 1948 to 1985, where he taught violin, viola, conducting, as well as music appreciation classes directed primarily toward non-music majors. He was conductor of the Seattle Youth Symphony Orchestras from 1960 to 1988,  and principal violist of the Seattle Symphony from 1959 to 1963.  He was the featured soloist with the Seattle Symphony for subscription concerts held March 7 and 8, 1960, performing Harold in Italy by Hector Berlioz.
  
Sokol was raised in Ambridge, Pennsylvania. At the age of 16, he studied with Otakar Ševčík in Boston. He received a bachelor's degree in music from Oberlin College in 1938, where he studied violin with Raymond Cerf, and studied for one year on scholarship with Jaroslav Kocián at the State Conservatory of Music in Prague. He studied under a fellowship grant at the Juilliard School in New York City.

Upon his return from Prague, he taught at Shorter College in Rome, Georgia for two years. He returned in 1941 to Oberlin College to pursue graduate work, but was drafted when the United States entered the Second World War. He served in Miami Beach, Florida, Lincoln, Nebraska and Biloxi, Mississippi. Following his discharge in 1945, he returned to Oberlin College to continue his graduate work. Before coming to Seattle, he taught at the University of Kentucky (1946–7), and the Kansas City Conservatory of Music (1947–8), which has been part of the University of Missouri–Kansas City since 1959.

Sokol was one of the first American teachers to meet Shinichi Suzuki and apply aspects of his teaching method.

On August 19, 2011, Sokol died, aged 96, in Seattle, Washington from cancer.

Films
1974 – 1812 Overture filmed at Pacific Northwest Music Camp at Fort Flagler State Park.
1984 – Alan Hovhaness. Directed by Jean Walkinshaw, KCTS-TV, Seattle.

References

1915 births
2011 deaths
American people of Czech descent
American conductors (music)
American male conductors (music)
Deaths from cancer in Washington (state)
American music educators
University of Washington faculty
Musicians from Seattle
Juilliard School alumni
Place of birth missing